Primera Cita is the debut studio album by Latin boy band CNCO. It was released on 26 August 2016, through Sony Music Latin. The album was the recipient for the Lo Nuestro Award for Pop Album of the Year at the 29th ceremony

Commercial performance
The album debuted at number one on the Billboard Top Latin Albums chart with first-week sales of 11,000 copies in the United States. It also accumulated over one million streams on Spotify in just hours after its release. Primera Cita was the best-selling Latin debut album of 2016 in the United States and Puerto Rico. The album also debuted in the top 10 in 15 countries, including number one in Bolivia, Ecuador and Guatemala.

Accolades

Track listing

Charts

Weekly charts

Monthly charts

Year-end charts

Certifications

Más Allá Tour

CNCO embarked on the Más Allá Tour in order to support the album. The tour began on February 26, 2017, in Cochabamba, Bolivia and concluded on December 16, 2017, in Buenos Aires, Argentina.

Setlist
This set list is representative of the show on April 1, 2017, in Santo Domingo, Dominican Republic. It is not representative of all concerts for the duration of the tour.
 
 "Quisiera"
 "Tan fácil"
 "Reggaetón Lento (Bailemos)"
 "Primera cita"
 "Para enamorarte"
"No entiendo"
"Devuélveme mi corazón"
 "Cometa"
 "Volverte a ver"
 "Tu luz"
 "Cien"
 "Más allá"
 "Quisiera (ballad remix)"
 "Tan fácil (urban remix)"

Tour dates

Cancelled shows

Notes

See also 
 2016 in Latin music
 CNCO discography
 List of number-one Billboard Latin Albums from the 2010s

References 

2016 debut albums
CNCO albums
Sony Music Latin albums
Spanish-language albums